Sankt Georgen Airport is a private use airport located  south of Sankt Georgen am Ybbsfelde, Lower Austria, Austria.

See also
List of airports in Austria

References

External links 
 Airport record for Sankt Georgen Airport at Landings.com

Airports in Lower Austria